Redemption (first published 1995) is a novel by author Leon Uris.  It is a sequel to his epic 1976 book, Trinity.

Set mainly in the first half of the twentieth century in the years leading to the Irish Easter Rising, it tells the stories of the Irish revolutionary Conor Larkin's family, his brothers Liam and Dary, and Liam's son Rory.

After emigrating from Ireland to New Zealand, Liam establishes his own dynasty and sets to repeat the same cycle of conflict with his own sons as his father, Tomas.

Rory becomes a World War I war hero in the Gallipoli campaign. Rory's uncle Dary takes Catholic clerical vows, only to have a powerful love drive him to question both celibacy and his calling.

1995 American novels
HarperCollins books
History of Ireland (1801–1923)
Novels by Leon Uris
Novels set during World War I
Novels set in New Zealand
Sequel novels
Works about the Gallipoli campaign